Cheviot Hills is a neighborhood on the Westside of the city of Los Angeles, California.

Founded in 1924, the neighborhood has served as the filming location of movies and television shows due to its convenient location between Sony Studios and Fox Studios. The neighborhood has also long been home to many actors, recording artists, and television and studio executives.

Geography

According to The New York Times, Cheviot Hills is bounded by the northern limits of the Rancho Park Golf Course and the Hillcrest Country Club to the north, Patricia Avenue and Manning Avenue to the west and southwest, and Beverwil Drive and Castle Heights Avenue to the east and southeast.

According to the Mapping L.A. project of the Los Angeles Times, Cheviot Hills' street and other borders are Rancho Park Golf Course and Hillcrest Country Club to the northwest; Anchor Avenue and Club Drive to the east; and Manning Avenue to the southwest. Using these boundaries, Cheviot Hills is flanked on the north by West Los Angeles and Century City, on the east by Beverlywood and Castle Heights, on the south by Palms, and on the west by Rancho Park.

The Mapping L.A. boundaries are broader than those recognized by the Cheviot Hills Homeowners' Association (CHHOA). Although the CHHOA covers areas beyond the original Cheviot Hills tract, such as Monte-Mar Vista and most of Tract 13945, Mapping L.A.'s boundaries also include all or parts other neighborhoods, such as Castle Heights and California Country Club Estates, which have their own homeowners' associations.

Population
The 2000 U.S. census counted 6,945 residents in the 1.54-square-mile Cheviot Hills neighborhood—an average of 4,520 people per square mile, among the lowest densities for the city; The acreage include the open areas of the Cheviot Hills Park, the Rancho Park Golf Course and Hillcrest Country Club. in 2008, the city estimated that the population had increased to 7,303. The median age for residents was 42, older than the city at large; the percentages of residents aged 50 to 64 were among the county's highest.

The neighborhood was considered "not especially diverse" ethnically, with a high percentage of white people in comparison to the rest of Los Angeles. The population was 78.8% Non-Hispanic White, 9.1% Asian, 8.3% Hispanic or Latino, 1.3% Black, and 2.5% from other groups.  Japan (8.8%) and Mexico (7.7%) were the most common places of birth for the 20.8% of the residents who were born abroad—considered a low figure for Los Angeles.

The median yearly household income in 2008 dollars was $111,813, a high figure for Los Angeles, and the percentage of households earning $125,000 and up was considered high for the county. The average household size of 2.2 people was low for both the city and the county. Renters occupied 35.7% of the housing stock and house- or apartment owners held 64.3%.

The percentages of veterans who served during World War II or the Korean War were among the county's highest.

History

Almost all of today's Cheviot Hills was within the Spanish land grant known as Rancho Rincon de los Bueyes. Largely undeveloped until the 1920s, initial construction in the residential section west of Motor Avenue dates to the 1920s. From the 1920s to 1953, the streetcar line known as the Santa Monica Air Line of the Pacific Electric Railway ran along the southern edge of Cheviot Hills and provided passenger service between Cheviot Hills, downtown Los Angeles, and downtown Santa Monica. Much of the neighborhood east of Motor Avenue and south of Forrester Drive was built on the site of the former California Country Club, and the residences date to the early 1950s. The neighborhood features several homes by prominent architects, such as the Strauss-Lewis House by Raphael Soriano and the Harry Culver Estate, designed by Wallace Neff.

The neighborhood was originally middle class, with 1926 prices for homes starting at $50,000, or around $663,000 today. However, prices have increased dramatically in recent years and now rival those of neighboring Beverly Hills, Bel Air, and Holmby Hills, resulting in a surge of new development at the cost of many of the neighborhood's original 1920s homes. Consequently, Cheviot Hills was named Redfin's "hottest" neighborhood in the country for real estate for 2014, and the "hottest" neighborhood in Los Angeles for 2015. In 2015 CityLab named Cheviot Hills as the 24th most expensive neighborhood in the United States to rent in.

Monte Mar Vista

Developed between 1926 and 1940, Monte Mar Vista is the most affluent part of Cheviot Hills. The neighborhood was originally developed by W.R. McConnell, Fred W. Forrester, and John P. Haynes and consists of sixteen blocks along the northern side of Cheviot Hills bound by the Hillcrest Country Club, Cheviot Hills Park, and Rancho Park Golf Course to the north, west, and east and Lorenzo, Forrester, and Club Drive to the south. In 1928, the development was taken over by Ole Hanson and the Frank Meline Company, who continued to develop the neighborhood. Because of the area's location, many properties enjoy expansive views that overlook the Hillcrest Country Club and Rancho Park Golf Course as well as views of Century City, the Hollywood Hills, and the Hollywood Sign. Many of the lots are large, often covering several parcels, and homes were designed by prominent architects including John L. DeLario, Roland E. Coartes, Wallace Neff, and Eugene R. Ward. The first house designed by Craig Ellwood, Lappin House, is located in this part of Cheviot Hills.

California Country Club Estates

Built in 1952 on the site of the former California Country Club, California Country Club Estates is a neighborhood of single-family homes that is known locally as New Cheviot, as opposed to the rest of Cheviot Hills which is known as Old Cheviot. The neighborhood is located within Cheviot Hills, bound to the north by Club Drive and to the west by Queensbury Drive, but has a separate home owner's association with binding CC&Rs attached to each lot, and its borders are marked by signs and central medians. The neighborhood was originally developed by Sanford Adler, the owner of the Flamingo Las Vegas and El Rancho Hotel and Casino, and included homes built by architects such as A. Quincy Jones.

Filming locations
Situated within a short drive of both Fox Studios and Sony Pictures Studios, the neighborhood has often been the site for the filming of motion pictures and television shows.
 
Examples dating to the 1920s and 1930s include the Laurel and Hardy films The Finishing Touch, Big Business, and Bacon Grabbers, among others. Later examples include The Ropers television series from the late 1970s and the movie Private School in 1983.

Government and infrastructure
The Los Angeles County Department of Health Services SPA 5 West Area Health Office serves Cheviot Hills.

Police service
The Los Angeles Police Department operates the West Los Angeles Community Police Station at 1663 Butler Avenue, 90025, serving the neighborhood.

Education

Sixty percent of Cheviot Hills residents aged 25 and older had earned a four-year degree by 2000, a high figure for both the city and the county. The percentages of residents of that age with a bachelor's degree or a master's degree were also considered high for the county.

The schools near Cheviot Hills are as follows:

 Overland Avenue Elementary School, LAUSD, 10650 Ashby Avenue
 Vista School, private K–12, 3200 Motor Avenue
 Lycée Français de Los Angeles Kabbaz High School

Parks and recreation

Cheviot Hills features the Cheviot Hills Park, the Cheviot Hills Recreation Center, the Cheviot Hills Tennis Courts, and Rancho Park Golf Course. The park and recreation center have a community room which has a capacity of 80 to 100 people. In addition they have an auditorium, barbecue pits, a lighted baseball diamond, an unlighted baseball diamond, lighted indoor basketball courts, lighted outdoor basketball courts, a children's play area, an indoor gymnasium without weights, picnic tables, and lighted volleyball courts. The Cheviot Hills Tennis Courts consists of fourteen lighted tennis courts. The Cheviot Hills Pool is an outdoor unheated seasonal pool in Cheviot Hills. On May 11, 2012, after a campaign fundraiser at the nearby home of actor George Clooney, President Barack Obama played a game of basketball at the Cheviot Hills Recreation Center with Clooney, actor Tobey Maguire and others.

There are also two private country clubs in the neighborhood, both of them founded in response to then-prevailing membership discrimination at other Los Angeles clubs. Hillcrest Country Club was founded in 1920 as a country club for Jews, then largely excluded from other clubs. It features an 18-hole golf course, tennis courts, and swimming pools. The Griffin Club, previously known as the Beverly Hills Country Club, was founded in 1926, and was originally intended for people working in the entertainment industry who, at that time, were also excluded by most Los Angeles clubs. It has tennis courts and swimming pools. In the past the neighborhood also contained the California Country Club, which was replaced by a development called California Country Club Estates in 1952. There is also a small park, Club Circle Park, in the heart of the neighborhood, and a playground, Irving Schachter Park, on the outskirts.

Notable residents
L. B. Abbott, cinematographer 
Maria Altmann, recovered Gustav Klimt paintings stolen from her family by the Nazis
Lucie Arnaz, actress
Lucille Ball, actress
Travis Barker, drummer from Blink-182
Nuno Bettencourt, musician
Barbara Bel Geddes, actress
Bruce Bennett, Olympic silver medalist, actor known for the role of Tarzan.
Arthur Bergh, composer
Jan Berry, singer
Benjamin Franklin Bledsoe, judge, candidate for mayor of Los Angeles
Ray Bradbury, author
Ty Burrell, actor
J. Curtis Counts, sixth director of the Federal Mediation and Conciliation Service
Harry Culver, real estate developer who founded Culver City, California
Vic Damone, singer
Glenn Danzig, singer
Brooklyn Decker, model, actress
Kelly Emberg, model
Alex Haley, author
June Haver, actress
Ted Healy, actor, creator of The Three Stooges
Jonah Hill, actor
Marin Hinkle, actress
Anna Homler, artist
Marianne Jean-Baptiste, actress
Buster Keaton, actor
Stan Laurel, actor
Helie Lee, author, director
Laurie Levenson, law professor
Dave Madden, actor
Marjorie Main, actress
Thom Mayne, architect
Michael McKean, actor
Ken Mok, television producer
Christoper Miller, writer, director, producer
Agnes Moorehead, actress
Trevor Morris, music producer, composer
Bill Mumy, actor
Joel Murray, actor
George Newbern, actor
Annette O'Toole, actress
Jack Paar, comedian
John Payne, actor
Michelle Phillips, actress, singer best known for her vocals in the folk music band The Mamas & the Papas
Paul Pierce, NBA player
Mary Kay Place, actress
Maureen Reagan, actress, daughter of Ronald Reagan
Andy Roddick, professional tennis player
Leo Rosten, screenwriter
Hal Roach, film and television producer
William Shatner, actor best known for the role Captain James T. Kirk in the Star Trek franchise. 
Phil Silvers, actor
Patrick Soon-Shiong, billionaire founder of Abraxis BioScience and American Pharmaceutical Partners
Pam Teeguarden, professional tennis player
Henri Temianka, musician
Daniel Thompson, inventor
Marshall Thompson, actor
Rudy Tomjanovich, former NBA player
Joseph A. Valentine, Academy Award nominated cinematographer
Tasia Valenza, actress
Johnny Weissmuller, Olympic gold medalist, actor who succeeded Bennett in the role of Tarzan. 
Pete Wilson, governor of California and United States senator
Valerie Zimring, Olympic gold medalist

See also
 Expo Phase 2 (Los Angeles Metro)
 List of districts and neighborhoods of Los Angeles

References

External links
Cheviot Hills Homeowners Association
 California Country Club Homes Association
 Cheviot Hills crime map and statistics
 https://www.google.com/maps/place/Cheviot+Hills,+Los+Angeles,+CA

Neighborhoods in Los Angeles
Westside (Los Angeles County)
West Los Angeles